Robert "Bobby" Kirkland (born c. 1936) is a Scottish curler.

Kirkland and the entirety of his 1964 Scottish champion rink were farmers from Hamilton.

Teams

References

External links
 
Other Club Achievements | Avondale Heather Curling Club (look at "Hugh Neilson and his rink of Robert Kirkland, Andrew Neilson and Stewart Anderson won the 2017 Lanarkshire Superleague after a very close and well played game against Luke Carsons rink.")
The T B Murray Troph - Curling History (look at "Robert Kirkland")
Hamilton Advertiser: 2018-03-29 - TOP ... - PressReader (look at "Robert Kirkland")

Living people
1930s births
Scottish male curlers
Scottish curling champions
Sportspeople from Hamilton, South Lanarkshire
Scottish farmers